Stefania Chieppa (born 5 April 1983) is an Italian former tennis player.

Her career-high singles ranking is world No. 359, which she reached on 10 July 2006. On 9 July 2007, she peaked at No. 204 of the  doubles rankings. In her career, she won two singles and 15 doubles titles on the ITF Women's Circuit.

In July 2016, she played her last match on the circuit.

ITF Circuit finals

Singles: 10 (2 titles, 8 runner-ups)

Doubles: 36 (15–21)

References

External links
 
 

1983 births
Living people
Sportspeople from Turin
Italian female tennis players
Mediterranean Games bronze medalists for Italy
Mediterranean Games medalists in tennis
Competitors at the 2005 Mediterranean Games
20th-century Italian women
21st-century Italian women